Tarrytown is a village in the town of Greenburgh in Westchester County, New York. To the north of Tarrytown is the village of Sleepy Hollow (formerly "North Tarrytown"), to the south the village of Irvington and to the east unincorporated parts of Greenburgh. The Tappan Zee Bridge crosses the Hudson at Tarrytown, carrying the New York State Thruway (Interstates 87 and 287) to South Nyack, Rockland County and points in Upstate New York. The population was 11,860 at the 2020 census.

History

The Native American Weckquaesgeek tribe, who were closely related to the Wappinger Confederacy and further related to the Mohicans, lived in the area prior to European settlement. They fished the Hudson River for shad, oysters and other shellfish. Their principal settlement was at what is now the foot of Church Street near the Hudson River shore, between the current location of Losee Park and the Tappan Zee Bridge, at a place they called Alipconk, or the "Place of Elms".

The first European settlers of Tarrytown were Dutch farmers, fur trappers, and fishermen. Records show that the first Dutch residence in Tarrytown was built in 1645; however, the exact location of this residence is not known.  Tarrytown sits within the lands of the former Dutch Colony of New Netherland which became English territory in 1674 with the signing of the Treaty of Westminster. The name may come from the Dutch tarwe, meaning "wheat".

In 1780, in a famous Revolutionary War incident, Major John André was arrested as a spy in Tarrytown, which exposed the plans of his associate Benedict Arnold. André, a British army officer, was traveling south through the village on the Albany Post Road when he was stopped and searched by three local militiamen. When suspicious papers were found in his boot, he was arrested as a spy, later convicted, and hanged. A circumstantial account of André's capture by militiamen David Williams, John Paulding, and Isaac Van Wart was written in 1903 by the owner and publisher of the Tarrytown Argus, Marcius D. Raymond.

The writer Washington Irving described Tarrytown in "The Legend of Sleepy Hollow" (1820). Irving began his story, "In the bosom of one of those spacious coves which indent the eastern shore of the Hudson, at that broad expansion of the river denominated by the ancient Dutch navigators of the Tappan Zee, and where they always prudently shortened sail and implored the protection of St. Nicholas when they crossed, there lies a small market town or rural port which by some is called Greenburgh, but which is more generally and properly known by the name of Tarry Town." The Underground Railroad ran through Tarrytown prior to the end of the U.S. Civil War.

Tarrytown later became a favorite residence for many rich New Yorkers, including John D. Rockefeller, who first moved to Tarrytown in 1893. Kykuit, Rockefeller's elaborate mansion, was completed in 1906.  In 1914, Kykuit became the site of numerous labor protests by radical anarchists, which protests were broken up by police in a series of violent clashes.  Kykuit was the intended target of at least two bombing attacks planned by anarchists associated with the radical journalists Alexander Berkman and Luigi Galleani.

On November 19, 1915, a powerful dynamite bomb was discovered at Cedar Cliff, the Tarrytown estate of John D. Archbold, President of the Standard Oil Company. Police theorized the bomb was planted by anarchists and Industrial Workers of the World radicals as a protest against the execution of IWW member Joe Hill in Salt Lake City. The bomb was discovered by a gardener, John Walquist, who found four sticks of dynamite, weighing a pound each, half hidden in a rut in a driveway 50 feet from the front entrance of the residence. The dynamite sticks were bound together by a length of wire, fitted with percussion caps, and wrapped with a piece of paper matching the color of the driveway, a path used by Archbold when going to or from his home by automobile. The bomb was later defused by police.

The Christ Episcopal Church, First Baptist Church of Tarrytown, Foster Memorial AME Zion Church, Washington Irving High School, North Grove Street Historic District, Patriot's Park, and Tarrytown Music Hall are listed on the National Register of Historic Places. Lyndhurst and Sunnyside are listed as National Historic Landmarks.

The General Motors car manufacturing plant North Tarrytown Assembly was located in North Tarrytown until 1996.  Today's Metro-North Railroad's Hudson Line runs through the abandoned property.

Sleepy Hollow Mayor Philip Zegarelli, in March 2007, met with Tarrytown Mayor Drew Fixell and district superintendent Howard Smith to discuss forming a blue-ribbon panel that would explore the pros and cons of an intermunicipal agreement. The two villages have shared a school district for 55 years. The villages already shared some services, as well, to lower their expenses, but the greatest reductions, especially in school and property taxes, would come from merging the two villages. However, each village has its own assessment roll. Zegarelli, who led an unsuccessful attempt in the mid-1970s to disaffiliate Sleepy Hollow from the town of Mount Pleasant, continues to advocate for secession – Sleepy Hollow from Mount Pleasant and Tarrytown from Greenburgh – as another way to save money. "If the idea is to save money, why have two levels of government?" he asked. The town of Mount Pleasant blocked Sleepy Hollow's effort to secede, largely because it did not want to lose tax revenue from General Motors, Zegarelli said.

In 2014, Tarrytown was ranked second in the list of the top 10 places to live in New York, according to the national online real estate brokerage Movoto.

Geography and climate

Demographics

As of the census of 2000, there were 11,090 people, 4,533 households, and 2,765 families residing in the village. The population density was 3,724.7 inhabitants per square mile (1,436.9/km2). There were 4,688 housing units at an average density of 1,574.5 per square mile (607.4/km2). The racial makeup of the village was 77.44% White, 7.04% African American, 0.22% Native American, 6.49% Asian, 0.05% Pacific Islander, 5.29% from other races, and 3.47% from two or more races. Hispanic or Latino of any race were 16.17% of the population.

There were 4,533 households, out of which 26.6% had children under the age of 18 living with them, 48.5% were married couples living together, 9.6% had a female householder with no husband present, and 39.0% were non-families. 31.2% of all households were made up of individuals, and 9.7% had someone living alone who was 65 years of age or older. The average household size was 2.33 and the average family size was 2.95. In the village, the population was spread out, with 19.7% under the age of 18, 8.6% from 18 to 24, 34.8% from 25 to 44, 22.5% from 45 to 64, and 14.4% who were 65 years of age or older. The median age was 37 years. For every 100 females, there were 82.5 males. For every 100 females age 18 and over, there were 77.8 males. The median income for a household in the village was $68,762, and the median income for a family was $82,445. Males had a median income of $61,699 versus $41,054 for females. The per capita income for the village was $39,472. About 1.8% of families and 4.7% of the population were below the poverty line, including 5.4% of those under age 18 and 4.6% of those age 65 or over.

Transportation

Tarrytown has access to highways I-87 and I-287, and is the site of the eastern end of the New York State Thruway's Tappan Zee Bridge. I-87 continues south to New York City, while I-287 heads east across Westchester to link up with the Saw Mill River Parkway, the Taconic State Parkway, the Sprain Brook Parkway, the Merritt Parkway/Hutchinson River Parkway and I-95.

Tarrytown railway station is served by Metro-North Railroad commuter service. Metro-North trains go to New York City's Grand Central Terminal, and also go as far north as Poughkeepsie. Tarrytown is a major stop on the Hudson Line due to a large number of commuters crossing the Tappan Zee Bridge from Rockland County to catch express service to Manhattan.

Bee-Line Bus System service is also provided within Tarrytown:
 BL1T: Tarrytown Railroad Station, Getty Square intermodal transit hub in Yonkers, or IRT 242nd Street Station, Bronx
 BL1W: White Plains, Getty Square intermodal transit hub in Yonkers, or IRT 242nd Street Station, Bronx (via NY 119)
 BL13/BL13B: Ossining Railroad Station or Port Chester (13B trips operate via Benedict Avenue)

Points of interest

 Lyndhurst, a Gothic Revival mansion formerly owned by Jay Gould
 Sunnyside, historic home of author Washington Irving
 Tarrytown Music Hall, one of the oldest surviving theaters in Westchester County; one of 6% in the US built before 1900
 Tappan Z Gallery Contemporary and Fine Art Gallery in the heart of Main Street
 Marymount campus of Fordham University
 Reformed Church of the Tarrytowns
 Hackley School
 Historical Society Serving Sleepy Hollow and Tarrytown
 Castle on the Hudson
 Tarrytown Reservoir

Economy

Tarrytown serves as the headquarters for the following businesses:
Regeneron Pharmaceuticals
 Bayer HealthCare, Medical Care
 R3 Energy Management Audit & Review, New York Headquarters
 Hitachi America, Eastern Region Center
 Hitachi Medical Corporation of America
 Life Support Technologies group, an advanced hyperbaric medicine and chronic wound healing company.
 Off-Loading Technologies Inc.
 Siemens Medical Solutions Diagnostics, North American Headquarters
 Prestige Consumer Healthcare

Education
Tarrytown was home to Marymount College, an independent women's college established in 1907. Amid financial struggle, Marymount was taken over by Fordham University in 2002, but the effort was unsuccessful: the last graduates of "Marymount College of Fordham University" received diplomas in 2007. The historic hilltop campus was sold to the Swiss firm EF and became a branch of its foreign exchange secondary school, the EF International Academy.

Local public schools are operated in concert with the neighboring village of Sleepy Hollow. A joint association, Public Schools of the Tarrytowns, supervises four separate K-8 schools, as well as Sleepy Hollow High School. A Roman Catholic elementary, the Transfiguration School, was established in 1949 and is maintained by the local parish.

Tarrytown is also home to the Hackley School, a private K–12 college preparatory. Situated on Castle Ridge, the school first opened in 1899.

The Westchester Library System has its headquarters just outside Tarrytown in an unincorporated area of Greenburgh.

Culture
In 2018 Brooke Lea Foster of The New York Times stated that it was one of several "Rivertowns" in New York State, which she described as among the "least suburban of suburbs, each one celebrated by buyers there for its culture and hip factor, as much as the housing stock and sophisticated post-city life." Of those, Foster stated that Irvington was "the most charming".

Religion
Tarrytown's churches (many of which are located on Broadway, the village's largest thoroughfare) cover all major denominations. Tarrytown is served by Episcopalian, Baptist, Catholic, Christian Science, Methodist, Reformed, and Korean churches. The Foster Memorial AME Zion Church on Wildey Street is the oldest black church in Westchester County. Tarrytown's single largest religious denomination is Roman Catholicism, with over 60% of residents of Tarrytown and Sleepy Hollow identifying as Catholics.  Three Roman Catholic churches (Church of the Transfiguration, Immaculate Conception Church, and St. Theresa's) serve the community's Catholics and provide numerous social services including the Transfiguration School. Tarrytown is also the home of the motherhouse of the Religious of the Sacred Heart of Mary, a Catholic woman's religious order that founded and staffed the now-defunct Marymount College (now EF School).

Tarrytown also has a large Jewish community, which encompasses all major denominations. Temple Beth Abraham, located on Leroy Avenue, services both the Reform and Conservative communities. The DoubleTree Inn features a Glatt Kosher kitchen, as well as an Orthodox prayer service (minyan) on the Jewish sabbath (Shabbat). The local Jewish Community Center, JCC on the Hudson, features family programs, camps, and educational opportunities from a non-denominational approach.

Notable people
Notable current and former residents of Tarrytown include:
 Jacob M. Appel, author
 Adam Badeau, Union Army brevet brigadier general and author
 J. David Bleich (born 1936), rabbi and authority on Jewish law and ethics
 Tim Maia, Brazilian singer, a.k.a. "Jimmy the Brazilian", lived in Tarrytown for a time during the late 1950s and early 1960s (1959-1963) before being arrested in Miami and deported back to his South American home country after a stint of six months in jail.
 Cabell "Cab" Calloway, III (December 25, 1907 – November 18, 1994), jazz singer and bandleader
 Greg Fitzsimmons, comedian
 Stuart W. Frost, entomologist, author, and professor at Pennsylvania State University
 Barbara Bel Geddes, actress in Dallas
 Eric Gaffney, former band member of Sebadoh
 Charles Griffes, composer and educator
 Milo Hastings, early 20th century science fiction writer and health food advocate
 Washington Irving, writer and diplomat
 Caitlyn Jenner, Olympian athlete
 Bill Kerr, professional football player
 Moon Kook-jin, founder of Kahr Arms
 Kevin Meaney, stand-up comedian and actor
 Norman Mingo, illustrator
 Sylvia Nasar, author recognized for A Beautiful Mind
 Florence Oberle, actress
 Moses F. Odell, congressman
 Clara Claiborne Park (1923–2010), author who raised awareness of autism
Brett Pesce, professional hockey player for the Carolina Hurricanes
 William Prince, actor
 Joe Queenan, writer
 Jenifer Rajkumar, politician
 David Sanborn, musician
 Jerome David Salinger, writer
 Jesse Lee Soffer, actor
 Sam Tanenhaus, American historian, biographer, editor of The New York Times Book Review and Week in Review, and journalist
 Mark Twain, writer
 Mark Whipple, football coach
 Vanessa L. Williams, actress
 Rockwell Kent, artist, illustrator

In popular culture

Films
The 1962 release of The Brain That Wouldn't Die was shot in and around Tarrytown in 1959
 In the movie On the Waterfront, Edie mentions that St. Ann's, the Catholic college where she is studying to be a teacher, is in Tarrytown, out in the country.
Main character in the movie The Commuter (2018) lives in Tarrytown.

Music
 The Frankie Valli song "Patch of Blue" (1970) references the town.
 The Vampire Weekend song "Finger Back" (2013) references the town.

Literature
 Washington Irving's story "The Legend of Sleepy Hollow" is set in and around Tarrytown. The name "Sleepy Hollow" comes from a secluded glen located north of Tarrytown. In 1996, the residents of North Tarrytown (a village north of Tarrytown around the area of Sleepy Hollow) voted to formally change the village's name to Sleepy Hollow.
 In F. Scott Fitzgerald's The Beautiful and Damned, millionaire Adam Patch's estate is in Tarrytown.
 Gabrielle Zevin 's book Memoirs of a Teenage Amnesiac is set primarily in the Tarrytown / Sleepy Hollow area.
 The Ellery Queen novel The Virgin Heiress (aka The Dragons Teeth) is set primarily in Tarrytown.
 In Judy Blume's Otherwise Known as Sheila the Great, Sheila Tubman's family spends their summer vacation in Tarrytown, which is where most of the book takes place.
 The book The Hollow by Jessica Verday is set in the Tarrytown/ Sleepy Hollow area and offers a modern interpretation of the events of Irving's original story.

Television
 In the TV series Divorce, Frances Dufresne lives in nearby Hastings and opens an art gallery on Main Street in Tarrytown.
 In the TV series Mad Men, Betty Draper plans to take her children on an antiquing trip to Tarrytown (Season 3, Episode 2), and her and Don's third child, Eugene Scott Draper, is born here.
In 1970s sitcom Rhoda, Marion, the ex-wife of Rhoda's husband Joe, lives in Tarrytown.
 In season 3 episode 25 (Sons and Lovers, Part 2) of the TV series "Will & Grace", Karen Walker says that she can imagine her friend Grace Adler living in Tarrytown.
 The children's TV series Jay Jay the Jet Plane centered on aircraft that live in Tarrytown.

Video games
 In The Legend of Zelda: Breath of the Wild, Tarrey Town and its founder Hudson are named after Tarrytown and the nearby Hudson River.
 Tarrytown is going to be included as a playable location in the upcoming Penny Blood video game (spiritual successor of the Shadow Hearts series of games, a franchise well known for its usage of places which exist, or existed before, in real life).

References

External links

 Village of Tarrytown official website
 The Hudson Independent, local newspaper
 Tarrytown-Sleepy Hollow Patch, local news website

 
Villages in New York (state)
New York (state) populated places on the Hudson River
Villages in Westchester County, New York
Washington Irving
Populated places on the Underground Railroad
Populated places established in 1870
1870 establishments in New York (state)